Jorge Manrique Islas (born 18 June 1979)  is a Mexican former footballer who last played for Irapuato and is currently manager of Liga de Expansión MX club Oaxaca.

External links

1979 births
Living people
Mexican footballers
Association football midfielders
C.D. Veracruz footballers
Chiapas F.C. footballers
Salamanca F.C. footballers
Irapuato F.C. footballers
Atlético San Luis footballers
Liga MX players
Ascenso MX players
Footballers from Mexico City